Alfred Biesiadecki (13 March 1839 – 31 March 1889) was a Polish pathologist born in Dukla.

He studied medicine at the University of Vienna, earning his medical doctorate in 1862. In 1865 he became an assistant at the institute of pathological anatomy in Vienna under Karl Rokitansky. From 1868 to 1876 he was a professor of pathological anatomy at the Jagiellonian University in Kraków, afterwards moving to Lviv where he served as Protomedikus, working as an organizer of health services.

Biesiadecki was a pioneer of Polish histopathology, remembered for contributions made in research of skin diseases. His name is associated with "Biesiadecki's fossa", a peritoneal recess that is also known as the iliacosubfascial fossa. He published medical treatises in Polish and German.

Selected publications 
 Über das Chiasma nervorum opticorum des Menschen und der Tiere (Involving the chiasma nervorum opticorum of humans and animals), 1860
 Untersuchungen über die Gallen- und Lymphgefässe der Menschenleber in pathologischen Zuständen (Studies on the bile and lymph vessels of the human liver in pathological states), 1867
 Beiträge zur physiologischen Anatomie der Haut (Contributions to the physiological anatomy of the skin), 1867
 Untersuchungen aus dem pathologisch-anatomischen Institut in Krakau (Investigations of the Pathological-anatomical Institute in Kraków), 1872
 Anatomija patologiczna gruczołów skórnych, 1874

References 
 Historia Anatomia Patologiczna Polskiej (translated biography)
 Zeno.org translated biography @ Pagel: Biographical Dictionary

University of Vienna alumni
19th-century Polish physicians
Histologists
1839 births
1889 deaths
Academic staff of Jagiellonian University
Polish pathologists